Bulingtar is a Rural municipality located within the Nawalpur District of the Gandaki Province of Nepal.
The rural municipality spans  of area, with a total population of 19,122 according to a 2011 Nepal census.

On March 10, 2017, the Government of Nepal restructured the local level bodies into 753 new local level structures.
The previous Bulingtar, Kotathar, Dadajheri Tadi, Arkhala, part of Jaubari and Bharatipur VDCs were merged to form Bulingtar Rural Municipality.
Bulingtar is divided into 6 wards, with Bulingtar VDC declared the administrative center of the rural municipality.

References

External links
official website of the rural municipality

Rural municipalities in Nawalpur District
Rural municipalities of Nepal established in 2017